This is an inclusive list of science fiction television programs whose names begin with the letter H.

H

Live-action
Halfway Across the Galaxy and Turn Left (1991–1992, Australia)
Halo (2022-present)
The Handmaid's Tale (2017-present)
Hard Time on Planet Earth (1989)
Harrison Bergeron (1995, film)
Harsh Realm (1999–2000, Canada/US)
HaShminiya a.k.a. The Octette (2005–2007, 2013–2014, Israel)
Haunted (2002)
Hauser's Memory (1970, film)
Helix (2014–2015)
Hero Corp (2008–2009, France)
Highcliffe Manor (1979) IMDb
Highlander (franchise):
Highlander: The Series (1992–1998) (elements of science fiction)
Highlander: The Raven (1998–1999, Highlander: The Series spin-off) (elements of science fiction)
Highlander: The Source (2007, film)
Highwayman, The (1987–1988)
Hilarious House of Frightenstein, The (1971, Canada)
Hitchhiker's Guide to the Galaxy, The (1981, UK)
Hollywood Off-Ramp IMDb
Holmes & Yo-Yo (1976–1977)
Homeboys in Outer Space (1996–1997)
Honey, I Shrunk the Kids (1997–2000)
Hora Marcada, La a.k.a. Marked Time, The (1986, Mexico, anthology)
How to Make a Monster (2001, film)
Humans (2015–2018)
Hunters (2016)
Hyperdrive (2006–2007, UK)
Hypernauts (1996)

Animation
.hack (franchise):
.hack//Sign (2002, Japan, animated)
.hack//Legend of the Twilight (2003, Japan, animated)
.hack//Roots (2006, Japan, animated)
Hakugei: Legend of the Moby Dick (1997–1999, Japan, animated)
Hand Maid May (2000, Japan, animated)
Harvey Birdman, Attorney at Law (2000–2007, animated)
He-Man and the Masters of the Universe (franchise):
He-Man and the Masters of the Universe (1983–1985, animated)
She-Ra: Princess of Power (1985–1987, animated)
New Adventures of He-Man, The (1990, animated)
He-Man and the Masters of the Universe (2002–2004, animated)
Heat Guy J (2002–2003, Japan, animated)
Heavy Gear: The Animated Series (2001, Canada, animated)
Heavy Metal L-Gaim (1984–1985, Japan, animated)
Heavy Object (2015, Japan, animated)
Hero: 108 (2010–2012, US/Canada/Taiwan/UK, animated)
Hero Factory (2010–2014, miniseries, animated)
Hero High (1981–1982, animated)
Heroes (2006–2010)
Heroic Age (2007, Japan, animated)
Heroman (2010, Japan, animated)
Highlander: The Animated Series (1994–1995, animated)
Hot Wheels (franchise):
Hot Wheels AcceleRacers (2005, animated)
Hot Wheels Battle Force 5 a.k.a. Battle Force 5 (UK/Ireland) (2009–2011, animated)
Human Kind Of (2018, animated)
Huntik: Secrets & Seekers (2009–2012, animated)
Hurricane Polymar (1974–1975, Japan, animated)
Hyper Police (1997, Japan, animated)

References

Television programs, H